The lake Gabriel-Fleury is part of the hydrographic slope of Ashuapmushuan Lake, flowing in the unorganized territory of Lac-Ashuapmushuan, in the Le Domaine-du-Roy Regional County Municipality, in the administrative region of Saguenay–Lac-Saint-Jean, Quebec, Canada. The lake is located right in the centre of the Ashuapmushuan Wildlife Reserve.

The Canadian National railway passes just  to the north, as does the route 167 connecting Chibougamau to Saint-Félicien.

Forestry is the main economic activity in the sector. Recreational tourism activities come second.

Geography 
The lake is mainly fed by the rivière de la Licorne (coming from the south) and by the discharge (coming from the north) of Lake Douvier. It has a large area of marsh around the eastern bay, as well as in the area of the confluence of the rivière de la Licorne.
The mouth of Lake Gabriel-Fleury is located at:
  south of the Canadian National railway and route 167;
  east of Chigoubiche Lake;
  east of the mouth of Ashuapmushuan Lake (i.e. the head of Ashuapmushuan River).

The mouth of Gabriel-Fleury Lake is located on its west shore.

Toponymy 
The toponym "lac Gabriel-Fleury" was made official on December 5, 1968, by the Commission de toponymie du Québec.

See also 
 Le Domaine-du-Roy Regional County Municipality
 Lac-Ashuapmushuan, an unorganized territory
 Rivière de la Licorne, a stream
 Ashuapmushuan Lake, a body of water
 Ashuapmushuan River, a stream
 Lac Saint-Jean, a body of water
 List of lakes in Canada

References 

Lakes of Saguenay–Lac-Saint-Jean
Le Domaine-du-Roy Regional County Municipality